(John) Cecil Hall  (17 May 1804 - 8 February 1844) was Archdeacon of Man from 19 September 1839 until his death.

The son of Charles Henry Hall, Dean of Christ Church he was educated at his father's college; and held incumbencies at Great Cressingham and Kirk Andreas. In 1832 he married Frances Amelia, daughter of The Honourable John Wingfield-Stratford.

Notes

1804 births
1844 deaths
Alumni of Christ Church, Oxford
Archdeacons of Man